Posyolok imeni Lenina is a rural locality (a settlement) in Slednevskoye Rural Settlement, Alexandrovsky District, Vladimir Oblast, Russia. The population was 97 as of 2010. There are 5 streets.

Geography 
The settlement is located 25 km west of Alexandrov (the district's administrative centre) by road. Arsaki is the nearest rural locality.

References 

Rural localities in Alexandrovsky District, Vladimir Oblast